Domna (Domno) is a rural locality (a selo) in Yeravninsky District, Republic of Buryatia, Russia. The population was 160 as of 2010. There are 11 streets.

Geography 
Domna is located 13 km northeast of Sosnovo-Ozerskoye (the district's administrative centre) by road. Sosnovo-Ozerskoye is the nearest rural locality.

References 

Rural localities in Yeravninsky District